Belvidere Historic District is a national historic district located at Belvidere, near Hertford, Perquimans County, North Carolina.  The district encompasses 68 contributing buildings, 3 contributing sites, and 6 contributing structures in the rural agricultural area around the village of Belvidere. The district developed between about 1800 and 1949, and includes notable examples of Federal and Greek Revival style architecture. Notable buildings include the Joseph Smith House, Rufus White House, Edwin S. White Farm, Fernando C. White Mill Complex, John J. Chappell, Jr. Farm, and Murray and Fernando C. White Farm.

The house was added to the National Register of Historic Places in 1998.

References

Historic districts on the National Register of Historic Places in North Carolina
Federal architecture in North Carolina
Greek Revival architecture in North Carolina
Buildings and structures in Perquimans County, North Carolina
National Register of Historic Places in Perquimans County, North Carolina